Edward Knowles (3 April 1868 – 23 June 1946) was a rugby union, and professional rugby league footballer who played in the 1890s, He played representative level rugby union (RU) for England, and at club level for Millom, as a forward, e.g. front row, lock, or back row, and representative level for rugby league (RL) Cumberland, and at club level for Millom, as a forward (prior to the specialist positions of), during the era of contested scrums. Prior to the 1899–1900 season, Millom was a rugby union club.

Background
Edward Knowles was born in Waberthwaite, Cumberland, England, and he died aged 78 in Millom, Cumberland, England.

Playing career
Knowles won caps for England (RU) while at Millom in 1896 against Scotland, and in 1897 against Scotland. When Millom converted from the rugby union code to the rugby league code for the 1899–1900 season, Knowles was approximately 31 years of age, he was both a rugby union, and rugby league footballer for Millom.

References

1868 births
1946 deaths
Cumberland rugby league team players
England international rugby union players
English rugby league players
English rugby union players
Millom R.L.F.C. players
People from Millom
Rugby league forwards
Rugby league players from Cumbria
Rugby union forwards
Rugby union players from Cumbria